Kay Huste (born 8 November 1974) is a German former boxer. He competed in the men's light welterweight event at the 2000 Summer Olympics.

References

1974 births
Living people
German male boxers
Olympic boxers of Germany
Boxers at the 2000 Summer Olympics
Boxers from Berlin
Light-welterweight boxers